Chel Mohammad-e Baqeri Pereshkaft (also Romanized as Chel Moḩammad-e Bāqerī Pereshkaft; also known as Cham-e Moḩammad Bāgherī and Chel Moḩammad-e Bāqerī) is a village in Dasht-e Rum Rural District, in the Central District of Boyer-Ahmad County, Kohgiluyeh and Boyer-Ahmad Province, Iran. At the 2006 census, its population was 48, in 11 families.

References 

Populated places in Boyer-Ahmad County